Simon Addo (born 11 December 1974) is a Ghanaian retired footballer who played as a goalkeeper.  He was a member of the Men's National Team that won the bronze medal at the 1992 Summer Olympics in Barcelona, Spain. He also competed at the 1996 Summer Olympics in Atlanta, United States.

Addo played for Kalamata in the Greek Alpha Ethniki.

References

External links
 
 
 

1974 births
Living people
Association football goalkeepers
Ghanaian footballers
Ghana international footballers
Footballers at the 1992 Summer Olympics
Footballers at the 1996 Summer Olympics
Olympic footballers of Ghana
Olympic bronze medalists for Ghana
1996 African Cup of Nations players
1998 African Cup of Nations players
Kalamata F.C. players
Place of birth missing (living people)
Olympic medalists in football
Medalists at the 1992 Summer Olympics
Ghapoha Readers players